Vassilios G. Agelidis is a professor at the Technical University of Denmark in Lyngby, Copenhagen. He previously held the same position at the University of New South Wales, Sydney. He was named Fellow of the Institute of Electrical and Electronics Engineers (IEEE) in 2016 for contributions to power electronics, renewable energy conversion and integration with electricity grid. He is also a fellow of the Institute of Engineering and Technology.

References

External links

20th-century births
Living people
Australian electrical engineers
Danish engineers
Academic staff of the University of New South Wales
Academic staff of the Technical University of Denmark
Fellow Members of the IEEE
Fellows of the Institute of Engineering and Technology
Year of birth missing (living people)
Place of birth missing (living people)